Aaron Robbins (born July 16, 1983) is an American football linebacker who is currently a free agent. He played as a tight end and defensive end for the University of Wyoming. In 2007, Robbins signed with the Pittsburgh Steelers as an undrafted free agent.

Early life
Born the son of Robin Sydnor and Robert Robbins, Aaron attended Smoky Hill High School in Aurora, Colorado. Robbins was named first team all-conference as a linebacker, while also being named second team all-conference as a fullback for the Buffalo. In addition, Robbins was named a 5A All-State Honorable Mention as a linebacker.

After not playing a year after high school, Robbins signed with the University of Wyoming on July 8, 2001. Robbins was not heavily recruited, as he did not receive any other FBS scholarship offers.

College career
Robbins played his first two seasons for the Cowboys as a tight end, before volunteering to move to the defensive line his junior season.

Statistics
Sources:

References

External links
 Jacksonville Sharks Bio
 Wyoming Cowboys Bio

1983 births
Living people
American football linebackers
Wyoming Cowboys football players
Arkansas Twisters players
Spokane Shock players
Jacksonville Sharks players
Orlando Predators players
Players of American football from Colorado
Sportspeople from Aurora, Colorado